Saint Zita (c. 1212–1272) is an Italian saint.

Zita may refer to:

Zita (name), primarily a feminine given name
Zita, Texas, an unincorporated community, United States
Zita, originally Vinter-Palatset, the oldest movie theater in the city of Stockholm which is still in operation today.
František Zíta (1909–1977), Czech chess master 
689 Zita, a minor planet
Tropical Storm Zita (1997), affecting southern China, Hong Kong, Vietnam and Laos
Tropical Storm Zita, in the 2006–07 South Pacific cyclone season
USS Zita (SP-21), a patrol vessel that served in the United States Navy during World War I

See also
Zeta (disambiguation)